Roger Christian may refer to:

 Roger Christian (songwriter) (1934–1991), American radio personality and lyricist
 Roger Christian (ice hockey) (1935–2011), American Olympic ice hockey player
 Roger Christian (filmmaker) (born 1944), British set decorator, production designer, and film director
 Roger Christian (Emerson Stevens), American radio personality best known for his 43-year run at WTSS
 Roger Christian, British musician, member of the band The Christians